Miss Monochrome: The Animation is an anime television series by Liden Films based on the character created and voiced by Yui Horie. The series follows the eponymous android Miss Monochrome, who seeks to become a famous idol. The first series aired on TV Tokyo between October 1 and December 24, 2013. Additionally, it was released by Niconico Channel, Bandai Channel, AT-X in Japan and was simulcast by Crunchyroll. An English dub version was released on Crunchyroll on July 21, 2015. A second season aired between July 3, 2015 and September 25, 2015. A third season began airing from October 2, 2015. For both seasons, the opening and ending themes respectively are "Black or White?" and "Step by Step", both performed by Miss Monochrome.

Episode list

Miss Monochrome: The Animation (2013)

Miss Monochrome: The Animation 2 (2015)

Miss Monochrome: The Animation 3 (2015)

References

Miss Monochrome